Percival Albert Trompf (1902–1964), was an Australian commercial artist, best known for his travel posters, books, advertising hoardings and pamphlets promoting the nation's tourist industry and Australian and international corporations and companies. His colour lithography was recognised as distinctive during his career and since, Art Deco in style, and innovative in its use of flat colour. Some of his designs depicted historical events, including the construction of the Sydney Harbour Bridge and Captain Cook's landing at Botany Bay, and advanced the iconic value of Australian destinations including the Outback, The Great Barrier Reef, and national identity and activities of sun-worship, surfing and bushwalking, using a visual language of modernity, promotion and consumerism. In turn his imagery has since become valued for its nostalgic evocation of the early mid-century and his posters have become collectible 'national treasures' that are frequently exhibited.

Early life

Trompf was born on 30 May 1902 in Beaufort, Victoria, the ninth child of Henry Alexander Trompf, a fruiterer, and his wife Catherine Amelia, née Elliott. His family later moved to Ballarat, and he was educated at Sebastopol Primary School. He developed an enduring interest in cricket and sang and competed as a member of a church choir.  He became one of the earliest students at the Ballarat School of Mines' Ballarat Technical Art School where he left with his certificate in 1917, and where he was remembered in 1930, when his posters were exhibited there, as "one of Ballarat's most notable old boys".

Career

In 1923, Trompf began designing confectionery boxes and wrappings for Giles & Richards, a Melbourne firm of commercial artists, before setting up his own studio in Little Collins Street, painting and designing thousands of advertising posters, usually of 25 x 40 inches (64 x 102 cm) format, and 24-sheet advertising hoardings, for which Trompf supervised all stages of production, including the lithographic printing. He also designed books and pamphlets throughout his career.

An early client was Charles Holmes (later editor of Walkabout, also a client) chairman of the Victorian Railways Betterment and Publicity Board under Harold Clapp. Holmes had recognising the successful use of poster advertising by the London Underground's Frank Pick, and hired Trompf for a similar campaign in the 1920s.

By 1931, Trompf was well known as a poster artist. "Scuu" in Smith's Weekly of August 8, 1931, rhetorically asked;

Clients included the Canadian Pacific Railway, Bryant & May, Palmolive, and the magazine Walkabout established March 25, 1929 by its parent body the Australian National Travel Association. For the latter Trompf produced posters targeted at a limited number overseas who could afford travel, and their designs and content reflect this niche market. By 1930, 100,000 posters had been distributed.

World War II 
In May 1942, he enlisted in the Royal Australian Air Force and was commissioned as a pilot in June. Trompf served mostly at Milne Bay, Papua New Guinea, and worked as a camouflage officer. He was demobilized in February 1948, with the rank of flying officer.

Postwar 

Returning to business after the war, Trompf received little work from A.N.T.A and the Victorian Railways. His clientele reduced during the 1950s to the Queensland Government Tourist Bureau, the Commonwealth Railways, and Victorian Education Department for road safety posters. He produced also some book covers, illustration and design, including Under southern skies, on the Dandenong Ranges, Mornington Peninsula and Gippsland for the Australian Publicity Council.

Poster design declined in the 1960s as magazines and travel institutions increasingly used more affordable colour photography rather than specially commissioning graphic illustrations, for the sake of faster turn-around and for more persuasive realism.

Reception
Trompf enjoyed a growing reputation alongside other poster artists James Northfield, Walter Jardine, Eileen Mayo, Gert Sellheim and C. Dudley Wood. In their 1940 report on the first annual show of the Australian Commercial and Industrial Artists’ Association in Sydney, The Bulletin characterised him as "one of the few poster men whose signature is well known." In 1985, surveying Australian representations of beach culture, historian Geoffrey Dutton equates Trompf to Max Dupain, Charles Conder and Sydney Nolan.

The colour lithography that Trompf used produced bold, simplified realism in an Art Deco style, with wide appeal, especially during the Great Depression. Posters exhorted Australians to travel by rail, to eat more fruit to the benefit of the country's struggling primary producers and, against competition from cars and buses contributing to unsustainable rail service deficits, they sought to promote diversity of purposes for travel that might provide new sources of revenue.  They promoted the simple joys of sun-worship, surfing and bushwalking, which were then becoming popular alongside a general interest in 'body culture' then pervasive among the young, famously celebrated in Trompf's best-known poster simply titled Australia.

In recent evaluations, Gilfedder, in analysing, as a sample, the visual rhetoric of Trompf's poster for the British market featuring Captain Cook's landing at Botany Bay to invite the traveler to 'Discover Australia', concludes that such travel posters were early instances of 'country branding'. Symes perceives that railway posters of this period using state-of-the-art techniques of the new field of commercial art developed Victoria's tourist geography, locating, labelling, visualising and imbuing places and regions with specific recreational and leisure attributes and Pocock attributes such responsibility, on a whole-of-Australia scale, to Trompf's 1933 poster   in advancing the Great Barrier Reef as one of the most significant tourist destinations. Dann and Barnes show how tourism marketing professionals including Trompf created a visual language of modernity, promotion and consumerism.

Barnes cites Trompf's Commonwealth Railway poster as applying an American aesthetic in depicting Central Australia; replacing North American pueblos with Australian indigenous ‘Arunta' men. Juxtaposing modern, white, explorers-cum-tourists with 'primitive natives’ each in formulaic groupings, positions and postures, the colonial figures and their vehicles are given centre- and stage-right to symbolise progress, while Aboriginal men are diminished in scale and backgrounded to represent their servility and symbolic position in the past.

The nostalgic attractiveness and historical interest of Trompf's posters endure; they are frequently included in public exhibitions, they have become collectible national treasures and they fetch up to $A12,000 at auction.

Personal life
On 14 May 1932, Trompf married Vera Johns at the Methodist Church, Armadale, Victoria, Melbourne, and they had two daughters. His nephew (b.1940) was religious historian Professor Garry W. Trompf.

Trompf died of a renal infection on 17 July 1964 in Heidelberg, Melbourne.

Works

1920s

1930s 
 
 
 
 
 
 
 
 
  Collins Street, Melbourne at the corner of Swanston Street, showing corner of Town Hall with clock tower with Manchester Unity Building, traffic in Collins street with tram travelling up Swanston Street

1940s

1950s

Posthumous

Exhibitions 
 2017, July 14 - October 15; Brave new world, National Gallery of Victoria
2012/13, December 12 - July 7; Treasures Gallery, National Library of Australia, 12 December 2012 - 7 July 2013
2008, March 5 - June 15; Bridging the Distance, National Library of Australia
2007/8, December 13 - February 17; Pioneers of the Inland: Australia's Muslim Cameleers 1860s - 1930s, National Library of Australia
2003/04, 22 October - March; Tourism in Australia: an exhibition of material from the Monash University Library Rare Books Collection, Sir Louis Matheson Library, Monash University
2001, August 10 - October 22; All the rage: the poster in Victoria 1850-2000, Keith Murdoch Gallery, State Library of Victoria
1999/2000, November - March; Follow the Sun, National Library of Australia

Collections 
 Art Gallery of New South Wales
 National Gallery of Australia
National Library of Australia
 National Museum of Australia
 Australian National Maritime Museum

Awards 
 1929: winner, Orient Company's first prize of £30 for a design in the annual industrial poster competition organised by the Royal Society of Arts
 1934: Ideal Label Contest  
 1946: First prize (£100) in the Blue Mountains Council's nation-wide competition

References

1902 births
1964 deaths
Australian commercial artists
Australian poster artists
Australian graphic designers
Royal Australian Air Force officers
Royal Australian Air Force personnel of World War II
National symbols of Australia
Tourism in Australia